Bring Me the Head of Charlie Brown is a 1986 American animated short fan film directed and animated by Jim Reardon, who would later become director and storyboard consultant for The Simpsons, and one of the co-writers of the Oscar-winning 2008 animated feature film WALL-E. The cartoon was made while he was at CalArts. This cartoon, done entirely in black-and-white, has a rough, unfinished-looking style.

Plot 
The short film is presented as a trailer for a faux Peanuts television special. The "special" is said to be due for broadcast on Tuesday night at 8:00 p.m., and to be sponsored by a foods company called Madison Barns, "makers of Ding Dongs, Twinkies, pooftas and wussy cakes," but the advertisements were only announced and were not shown on the film.

The short begins with the camera moving to the left side to show Linus, Lucy, Schroeder and Snoopy, who are kneeling in fear in front of the Great Pumpkin, who smokes a cigarette in front of the cast, as he puts a bounty on Charlie Brown's head on a wall, dead or alive, and thus prompting the entire Peanuts cast to try to kill him anyway they can. The first clip demonstrates Charlie Brown backing up while Lucy sets up for Charlie. He tells her that she is ready, but she gives him a moment as she strikes a match as she tries to get Charlie Brown to kick a bomb disguised as a football. When she lights the bomb up and calls him a blockhead, Charlie immediately rushes off to the football but when he kicks it, it explodes, and goes to the title card. Schroeder then appears, acting normal without his tiny piano in his hands. Charlie comes up to him and asks Schroeder what happened to his piano, only for his (full-sized, not toy) piano to fall on Charlie Brown's head while Schroeder ignores Charlie's question. Snoopy then prepares to fly like the flying ace but ends up getting shot by machine guns, as the narrator introduces him and the "Red Baron". Charlie then holds a York Peppermint Pattie (not the character as it was mentioned, as the character does not appear in the short film), and Snoopy bites off his hand (which gushes blood). Then it goes to the Kite-Eating Tree which falls on him. Meanwhile, at a scene with a wall of bricks, Linus arrives next to Charlie and begins talking to him, but Linus ends up strangling him unconscious with his blanket after Charlie recognizes that everyone is after him.

Charlie attempts to finally escape, but he finds Linus, Lucy (holding a spiked bat), Schroeder, and Snoopy running towards him. Having had enough, Charlie arms himself with a pump-action shotgun, a submachine gun, and an M16 assault rifle. He then executes the entire Peanuts cast one by one (with an exception of Snoopy being almost shot, but with his brain being shown). Charlie then gets shot in the shoulder by Lucy with a pistol from behind, but he turns around with his shotgun and shoots, making Lucy's head explode. The film then goes on a strange and darkly humorous montage in which Charlie shoots and kills everyone in his way: scores of Mexican banditos, a Wehrmacht machine gun nest behind which Adolf Hitler is painting a picture of a flower, and two other soldiers, and Richard Simmons doing jumping jacks, who then falls through a window. This is followed by his sister, Sally, being decapitated by an axe.

Following this is another montage, this time of Snookles the Baby Dragon calmly breathing fire, Pig Pen vomiting profusely in Violet's face, two biplanes crashing into each other in midair, Dagwood Bumstead getting kicked in the testicles by his wife, Blondie (which causes his head to pop off, resulting in a blood gush), Mickey Mouse getting hit on the head with a lead pipe while laughing, Rocky Balboa getting punched in the face by Popeye The Sailor Man, and Godzilla squeezing Dr. Pepper out of a giant soda can. It then ends showing off  various characters, including some taken to the hospital, some lying on the ground, one of the aforementioned crashed biplanes, and even one character resembling Billy from Family Circus hanging from a tree by a noose. Charlie Brown then announces, while holding his two guns, that "happiness is a warm Uzi" in a thick Arnold Schwarzenegger accent, though an Uzi was never used. The screen cuts to him smoking a cigarette in bed with the Little Red-Haired Girl (who, fittingly, is not fully seen), who asks Charlie Brown to turn off the bedroom light and go to sleep.

The song "Charlie Brown" by The Coasters plays over the end credits. The credits end with a note from Jim Reardon:

References to other media 
Jim Reardon makes several references to Sam Peckinpah films throughout the short. For example, the title itself – as well as the basic plot – is a play on Peckinpah's Bring Me the Head of Alfredo Garcia. The title is borrowed from National Lampoons parody of TV Guide.

The Peanuts massacre is a major satire of the climax in Sam Peckinpah's classic film The Wild Bunch. There are slow-motion death scenes intercut with rapid shots, much like Peckinpah's editing style. Violet's death scene, in which she spins around with her revolver, is a copy of Herrera's death scene at the start of the gun battle. The sequence in which Lucy shoots at Charlie Brown from behind and he spins around screaming and consequently kills her with a shotgun is shot-for-shot taken from the sequence where the prostitute shoots William Holden in the back. There is even a part where Charlie Brown waves his submachine gun around, screaming the famous Warren Oates scream, and the camera pan across several Mexican bandits being blown away. An interesting note is that Reardon actually uses sound bites from the movie in these two previous scenes.

The references to Peckinpah are made even more clear at the end of the film when Reardon dedicates it to Sam "The Man" Peckinpah.

There are some non-Peckinpah references made in the short, such as Charlie Brown's mohawk (a reference to Travis Bickle in Taxi Driver) and Lucy's speaking in a John Wayne drawl. Reardon also identifies Peanuts creator Charles M. Schulz as "Charles M. 'Dutch' Schulz," as in mobster Dutch Schultz.

Godzilla squeezing the giant Dr. Pepper can is a reference to the then-recent Dr. Pepper ad campaign featuring the famed monster surrounding the release of Godzilla 1985.

When Charlie Brown's arm is bitten off by Snoopy, the screaming sound effect is William Hanna's scream from the Tom and Jerry cartoons (and not Peter Robbins's similar-sounding yell that was used in most Peanuts specials up to that point). 
When Charlie Brown is being strangled by Linus, the sound effects are from the Monty Python skit "Farewell to John Denver".

The brief image of a small fire-breathing dragon is from Snookles, an animated short by Juliet Stroud, which, like this film, was produced at the California Institute of the Arts in 1986.

Cast and credits 
Charlie Brown – Etienne Badillo, Rich Moore, Mike Reardon, William Hanna, William Holden
Linus van Pelt – Nate Kanfer
Lucy van Pelt – Bret Haaland
Great Pumpkin – Jeff Pidgeon
Additional Voices – Ed Bell, Bruce Johnson, Mike Reardon, Bret Haaland
Narration – Rich Moore
Others – Ed Bell, Dale McBeath, Bob Winquist, Mike Giaimo, Craig Smith, Bret Haaland, Nate Kanfer, Doug Frankel, Mike Reardon, Rich Moore, Russ Edmonds, Hal Ambro, Dan Hansen, Jim Ryan, Tony Fucile, Jeff Pidgeon, Bob McCrea, Sarge Morton, Mom, Eileen, and Beverly
 Dedicated to Sam "The Man" Peckinpah
 "Peanuts Theme" – Vince Guaraldi
 "Charlie Brown" – The Coasters (wrongly credited as The Platters.)
 A Jim Reardon Cartoon – Made at Cal Arts, U.S.A.

References

External links 

Bring Me The Head of Charlie Brown at YouTube
Bring Me the Head of Charlie Brown on Dailymotion

1986 films
Fan films
Parodies of comics
Parodies of films
Unofficial works based on Peanuts (comic strip)
1980s parody films
1986 animated films
American student films
American animated short films
Cultural depictions of Dutch Schultz
1986 short films
1986 comedy films
1980s rediscovered films
Rediscovered American films
1980s English-language films
1980s American films
Films released on YouTube

de:Der große Kürbis#Bring Me the Head of Charlie Brown